Skerjafjörður ("skerry fjord") is a fjord located immediately west of Iceland's capital Reykjavík.  It is part of a larger bay, Faxaflói, on Iceland's west coast.

Fjords of Iceland